Halavar is a town in the Lori Province of Armenia.

References

External links 

Populated places in Lori Province